Cecilia Susana Caballero Navarro is a Cuban judoka. She won a medal from both the 1984 and 1986 Pan American Judo Championships.

Medals

Citations

Living people
Cuban female judoka
Year of birth missing (living people)
Place of birth missing (living people)
20th-century Cuban women
20th-century Cuban people